In sociology, a group action is a situation in which a number of agents take action simultaneously in order to achieve a common goal; their actions are usually coordinated.

Group action will often take place when social agents realize they are more likely to achieve their goal when acting together rather than individually. Group action differs from group behaviours, which are uncoordinated, and also from mass actions, which are more limited in place.

Group action is more likely to occur when the individuals within the group feel a sense of unity with the group, even in personally costly actions.

See also 

Affectional action
Collective action
Collective effervescence
Instrumental and value-rational action
Interpersonal relationship
Political movement
Social movement
Social relation
Socionics
Traditional action

References

Group processes
Sociological terminology